Timothy Asch (July 16, 1932 – October 3, 1994) was an American anthropologist, photographer, and ethnographic filmmaker. Along with John Marshall and Robert Gardner, Asch played an important role in the development of visual anthropology. He is particularly known for his film The Ax Fight and his role with the USC Center for Visual Anthropology.

Background
Asch was born in Southampton, New York and attended The Putney School.  He studied at Columbia University, where he received his B.S. in anthropology in 1959.  While at Columbia, he served as a teaching assistant for Margaret Mead, who encouraged his work in visual anthropology.  From 1950-1951, he served apprenticeships with Minor White, Edward Weston and Ansel Adams through the San Francisco Art Institute  (formerly known as the California School of Fine Arts). He received his M.A. in African Studies from Boston University (with an anthropology concentration at Harvard University) in 1964.

Career
Asch was known for his work as an ethnographic filmmaker on the Yanomami in conjunction with Napoleon Chagnon. He also worked in Indonesia with anthropologists Linda Connor, James J. Fox and E. Douglas Lewis.

In 1968, Asch and John Marshall co-founded Documentary Educational Resources (DER), a non-profit organization whose mission is to support, produce, and distribute ethnographic, non-fiction, and documentary films. Asch's film work continues to be distributed through DER.

Asch taught at New York University, Brandeis University, and Harvard University, and was a Research Fellow at the Australian National University prior to joining the University of Southern California (USC) in 1982. He became the Director of the Center for Visual Anthropology after the death of founder Barbara Myerhoff.  During his period at USC, he was involved with the Margaret Mead Film Festival.

Asch acted as Director of the Center for Visual Anthropology up until his death from cancer on October 3, 1994.  The Spring 1995 issue of Visual Anthropology Review (Vol. 11, No.1) was dedicated to Asch.

Filmography

Asch was a prolific filmmaker with an extensive list of more than 70 films to his credit. Over 40 of these are short films on the Yanomami in collaboration with Napoleon Chagnon.

Asch made most of his films for educational classroom use. He often showed his films to students and edited them based on student feedback. In one semester, Asch edited The Ax Fight up to twenty five times to make it more understandable and ideal for teaching. He was also a proponent of using film as a research and archive tool.

Marriage and family
Asch married Patricia Wood.  Together they acted as partners with other anthropologists in Afghanistan and Indonesia to produce films widely used in education and research.  They had four children: two daughters, Caya and Kim (who was adopted from South Korea) and sons Gregory (also known as DJ Olive) and Alexander.

References

Obituaries
Zsa Zsa Gershick, "ETHNOGRAPHIC FILMMAKING PIONEER TIMOTHY ASCH DIES", USC News, 17 Oct 1994, University of Southern California

Further reading and viewing

Film
Jayasinhji Jhala and Lindsey Powell. Morning with Asch. - 45 min. documentary (1995)

Text
Abrams, Ira. "Anthropological Filmmaking: Anthropological Perspectives on the Production of Film and Video for General Public Audiences." Visual Anthropology Review. 5.2, December 1989: 18-24.
 Barbash, Ilisa and Lucien Taylor. Cross-cultural Filmmaking: A Handbook for Making Documentary and Ethnographic Films and Videos. Berkeley: University of California Press, 1997.
Heider, Karl G. Ethnographic Film (Revised Edition). Austin: University of Texas Press, 2006.
Japenga, Ann. "Visual Anthropologist in the Director's Chair", Los Angeles Times, June 17, 1987: Section 5, page 1.
Lewis, E. Douglas. Timothy Asch and Ethnographic Film. New York: Routledge, 2003
 Ruby, Jay. "Out of Sync: The Cinema of Tim Asch", in  Picturing Culture: Essays on Film and Anthropology, Chicago: University of Chicago Press, 2000.
Jay Ruby, "Some Hurried Thoughts about Tim Asch and Patrick Tierney", Darkness in El Dorado Blog
 "Finding Aid to the Papers of Timothy Asch", National Anthropological Archives, National Museum of Natural History, Smithsonian Institution

External links
Timothy Asch: Biography 2, Documentary Educational Resources

, Filmography

Columbia College (New York) alumni
Harvard Graduate School of Arts and Sciences alumni
University of Southern California people
Cultural anthropologists
1932 births
1994 deaths
Visual anthropologists
The Putney School alumni
20th-century American anthropologists
Boston University alumni